Kristen Marie Griest (born October 2, 1989) is one of the two first women, along with Shaye Lynne Haver, to graduate from the United States Army Ranger School, which occurred on 21 August 2015. Griest and Haver were ranked 34th on Fortune magazine's 2016 list of the World's Greatest Leaders. In April 2016, Griest became the first female infantry officer in the US Army when the Army approved her request to transfer there from a military police unit.

Early life and education
Griest attended Amity Regional High School in Woodbridge, Connecticut, where she ran cross country and track.

Military career
Griest graduated from the United States Military Academy in 2011 and commissioned into the Military Police branch of the U.S. Army. She served as a Platoon Leader in the 4th Brigade Combat Team, 101st Airborne Division (AASLT) at Fort Campbell, Kentucky, from 2011 to 2014, including a deployment to Afghanistan in 2013.

Griest began Ranger training in the spring of 2015 as part of a one-time pilot program to see how women would do in Ranger School. She started the course with 380 men and 19 other women, marking the first time women have ever been allowed to participate through the course. 99 men and 2 women graduated from this starting pool. The third woman repeated the mountain phase. The three of them began training with Ranger Class 08–15. Haver and Griest failed the first phase of the course twice, though their performance impressed Ranger leaders enough to be offered a chance to start over from day one, commonly referred to as a "Day 01" recycle. They admitted to press that it was hard to start over, but said they weren't going to quit. "We decided right then and there that if that was what it was going to take to get our Tab, that's what it was going to take," Haver said. School officials report that In addition to Haver and Griest, five male candidates were also offered to start over the course from day one. One in four men make it through Ranger school without a recycle.

Upon graduating Ranger School, Haver remarked "It's pretty cool that they have accepted (Griest and Haver). We ourselves came to Ranger School skeptical, with our guards up, just in case there were haters and naysayers. But we didn't come with a chip on our shoulder like we had anything to prove. Becoming one of the teammates—that we could be trusted just like everyone else—whether it was on patrol or to carry something heavy or whatever—it was that every single time we accomplished something it gave us an extra foothold in being part of a team. I can say that without a doubt that the team that I am graduating with tomorrow accept me completely as a Ranger, and I couldn't be more proud and humbled by the experience." Griest made a statement agreeing with this sentiment, saying "My main concern in coming to Ranger School was I might not be able to carry as much weight or not be able to meet up to the same standard," she said. "I tried to do as much as I could, and I saw everybody else helping each other out and you just try to be the best teammate that you can."

At that time, women were not allowed to serve in Ranger/Infantry roles due to the Pentagon's exclusion policies on women in combat. That policy changed on 3 December 2015 when Secretary of Defense Ash Carter announced the United States military would open combat positions to women with no exception.

Upon graduating from the Maneuver Captains Career Course (MCCC), she took command of Bravo Company, 2nd Battalion, 505th Parachute Infantry Regiment on April 7, 2017.

Honors
In 2018, CPT Griest was inducted into the United States Army Women's Foundation Hall of Fame.

Misuse of name
Griest's name has been used fraudulently on phishing email messages unconnected with her, both dating scams and financial scams about billions of United States dollars missing in Iraq.

Awards and decorations

References

United States Army officers
United States Army Rangers
Living people
People from Orange, Connecticut
United States Military Academy alumni
1989 births
People from Woodbridge, Connecticut